Himmacia is a genus of moths of the family Depressariidae.

Species
 Himmacia diligenda (Meyrick, 1928)
 Himmacia huachucella (Busck, 1908)
 Himmacia stratia Hodges, 1974

Former species
 Himmacia languida (Meyrick, 1911)
 Himmacia refuga (Meyrick, 1916)

References

 
Depressariinae